Karamanica is a village in the municipality of Bosilegrad, Serbia. According to the 2002 census, the town has a population of 83 people.

References

External links 

Populated places in Pčinja District